Jon David Levy (born March 18, 1954) is the Chief United States district judge of the United States District Court for the District of Maine and former Justice of the Maine Supreme Court.

Biography

Levy received a Bachelor of Science degree in 1976 from Syracuse University. He received a Juris Doctor in 1979 from the West Virginia University College of Law where he was the lead article editor of the Law Review and graduated Order of the Coif. He served as a law clerk for Judge John Thomas Copenhaver Jr. of the United States District Court for the Southern District of West Virginia from 1979 to 1981. From 1981 to 1982, he was appointed by Judge William Wayne Justice to serve as a Special Court Monitor of the United States District Court for the Southern District of Texas. From 1983 to 1995, he was an attorney in private practice in York, Maine. From 1995 to 2002, he served as a Maine District Court Judge, serving as Deputy Chief Judge from 2000 to 2001 and Chief Judge from 2001 to 2002. From 2002 until his confirmation as a federal judge in 2014, he served as an Associate Justice of the Maine Supreme Judicial Court.

Federal judicial service

On September 19, 2013, President Barack Obama nominated Levy to serve as a United States District Judge of the United States District Court for the District of Maine, to the seat vacated by Judge George Z. Singal, who assumed senior status on July 31, 2013. On January 16, 2014 his nomination was reported out of committee by a 15–2 vote. On April 11, 2014 Senate Majority Leader Reid filed a motion to invoke cloture on the nomination. On April 29, 2014 the United States Senate invoked cloture on his nomination by a 63–34 vote. On April 30, 2014, his nomination was confirmed by a 75–20 vote. He received his judicial commission on May 2, 2014. He became Chief Judge on January 1, 2019.

See also
List of Jewish American jurists

References

External links

1954 births
Living people
Judges of the United States District Court for the District of Maine
Maine lawyers
Maine state court judges
Justices of the Maine Supreme Judicial Court
Syracuse University alumni
United States district court judges appointed by Barack Obama
West Virginia University College of Law alumni
21st-century American judges